Igor Denisov (3 September 1941 – 17 November 2021) was a Soviet-Russian physician and politician. A member of the Communist Party of the Soviet Union, he served on its Central Committee from 1990 to 1991 and was the last Minister of Health of the Soviet Union.

References

1941 births
2021 deaths
20th-century Russian physicians
Soviet Ministers of Health
Central Committee of the Communist Party of the Soviet Union members
People from Svobodny, Amur Oblast